John C. and Binford Carr House is a historic home located in the Hope Valley Historic District of Durham, North Carolina. It was built in 1958, and is a one-story, "T"-shaped brick, steel, and glass Modern Movement style dwelling with a flat roof.  It originally had 2,337 square feet and employs a Japanese aesthetic with a courtyard plan, a copper door with a simple copper appliqué design, and two sets of Shoji rice paper doors.

Binford Carr sold the property in December 2009 to Mark and Mimi Hansen. She also sold these new owners an empty, buildable lot next to the house.  The Hansens and the owners of the adjacent property to the east purchased the lot together, and divided it into two lots to make it unbuildable, thus protecting it from development. The Binford-Carr house now sits on .699 acres.

The Binford-Carr house was listed on the National Register of Historic Places in 2011.

References

Houses on the National Register of Historic Places in North Carolina
Modern Movement architecture in the United States
Houses completed in 1958
Houses in Durham, North Carolina
National Register of Historic Places in Durham County, North Carolina